Norcross may refer to:

Norcross, Georgia, a suburb in metro Atlanta
Norcross, Minnesota
Norcross (surname)
Norcross High School, a public school in Norcross, Georgia (named after Jonathan Norcross)